Sherrie Conley is an American politician. She is a Republican representing District 20 in the Oklahoma House of Representatives.

Political career 

In 2018, Conley ran to represent the 20th district in the Oklahoma House of Representatives. She defeated incumbent Bobby Cleveland in the Republican primary, and went on to win the general election. She is running for re-election in 2020.

Conley serves as the Assistant Majority Whip. She currently sits on the following committees:
 A&B Education
 Common Education
 Health Services and Long-Term Care
 Higher Education and Career Tech

Electoral record

References 

Living people
Republican Party members of the Oklahoma House of Representatives
Year of birth missing (living people)
21st-century American politicians
21st-century American women politicians
University of Central Oklahoma alumni
Southwestern Oklahoma State University alumni
Women state legislators in Oklahoma